The 2016–17 season is Domžale's 19th season in the Slovenian PrvaLiga, Slovenian top division, since the league was created. Domžale compete in Slovenian PrvaLiga, Slovenian Football Cup and UEFA Europa League.

Players
As of 13 December 2016

Source:NK Domžale

Transfer

Pre-season and friendlies

Summer

Competitions

Overall

Overview
{| class="wikitable" style="text-align: center"
|-
!rowspan=2|Competition
!colspan=8|Record
|-
!
!
!
!
!
!
!
!
|-
| PrvaLiga

|-
| Cup

|-
| Europa League

|-
! Total

PrvaLiga

League table

Results summary

Results by round

Matches

Cup

Round of 16

Quarter-finals

Semi-finals

UEFA Europa League

First qualifying round

Second qualifying round

Third qualifying round

Note:

Statistics

Goalscorers

Slovenian PrvaLiga
8 goals
 Slobodan Vuk
 Marko Alvir

4 goals
 Gaber Dobrovoljc

3 goals
 Amedej Vetrih
 Juninho
 Lucas Mario Horvat

2 goals
 Jure Balkovec
 Jure Matjašič
 Jan Repas
 Antonio Mance
 Benjamin Morel 

1 goal
 Matija Širok
 Denis Halilović
 Miha Blažič
 Žan Majer
 Elvis Bratanović 

Slovenian Football Cup
2 goals
 Elvis Bratanović 
 Luka Volarič 

1 goal
 Slobodan Vuk
 Álvaro Brachi
 Jure Matjašič
 Žan Majer

UEFA Europa League
3 goals 
 Matic Črnic 

2 goals
 Žan Majer 

1 goal
 Dejan Trajkovski 
 Marko Alvir 
 Gaber Dobrovoljc 
 Kenan Horić 
 Benjamin Morel

See also
2016–17 Slovenian PrvaLiga
2016–17 Slovenian Football Cup
2016–17 UEFA Europa League

References

External links
Official website 
Facebook profile
Twitter profile
PrvaLiga profile 
Soccerway profile
YouTube profile

Slovenian football clubs 2016–17 season
2016–17 UEFA Europa League participants seasons